A sunshower is a weather phenomenon.

Sunshower may also refer to:

Sunshower (Larry Willis album), 2001
Sunshower (Taeko Ohnuki album), 1977
Sunshower (Thelma Houston album), 1969
"Sunshowers", a 2004 single by M.I.A.
"Sunshower", a 1976 song by Dr. Buzzard's Original Savannah Band from the album Dr. Buzzard's Original Savannah Band
Sun Shower, a character from My Little Pony